The North American FJ-1 Fury was the first operational jet aircraft in United States Navy service, and was developed by North American Aviation as the NA-135.  The FJ-1 was an early transitional jet of limited success which carried over similar tail surfaces, wing, and canopy derived from the piston-engined P-51D Mustang. The evolution of the design to incorporate swept wings would become the basis for the land-based XP-86 prototype - itself originally designed with a very similar straight-wing planform to the FJ-1 airframe - of the United States Air Force's enormously influential F-86 Sabre, which in turn formed the basis for the Navy's carrier-based North American FJ-2/-3 Fury.

Design and development
Ordered in late 1944 as the XFJ-1 in competition with proposals from Douglas and Vought, the Fury began as a straight-wing, tricycle gear fighter with a single turbojet passing through the fuselage. The wing, empennage, and canopy strongly resembled that of the piston-engined P-51D Mustang, North American Aviation's highly successful World War II fighter, enclosing a relocated cockpit accommodation further forward in relation to the Mustang's design, to ensure good forward pilot visibility for carrier operations.

Operational history

The first flight of the prototype XFJ-1 took place on 11 September 1946, with the first of 30 deliveries beginning in October 1947. Flown by Navy squadron VF-5A, the FJ-1 made the USN's first operational aircraft carrier landing with a jet fighter at sea on 10 March 1948 aboard , pioneering US jet-powered carrier operations and underscoring the need for catapult-equipped carriers. The Fury was capable of launching without catapult assistance, but on a crowded flight deck the capability was of limited use. Taking off without a catapult launch limited the FJ-1 to a perilous, slow climb that was considered too risky for normal operations.

As German research into swept wing aerodynamics was not yet available when the design was finalized, the FJ-1 used a straight wing. No provision for wing-folding had been made as dive brakes mounted in the wings made that option unfeasible. In order to conserve carrier deck space, a unique "kneeling" nose undercarriage along with a swivelling "jockey wheel" allowed the FJ-1 to be stacked tail-high, close to another FJ-1.

Although ordered into production, the initial order for 100 units was trimmed to only 30 aircraft which were mainly used in testing at NAS North Island, California. VF-5A, soon redesignated as VF-51, operated the type in service beginning in August 1948. Although VF-51 went to sea on Boxer by May 1949, the FJ-1s were phased out in favor of the new F9F-2 Panther.

Ending its service career in U.S. Naval Reserve units, the FJ-1 eventually was retired in 1953. The one highlight in its short service life was VF-51's win in the Bendix Trophy Race for jets in September 1948. The unit entered seven FJ-1s, flying from Long Beach, California to Cleveland, Ohio, with VF-51 aircraft taking the first four places, ahead of two California Air National Guard Lockheed F-80 Shooting Stars.

Variants
XFJ-1 Prototype aircraft, powered by a 3,820 lbf (17 kN) General Electric J35-GE-2 turbojet engine, three built.
FJ-1 Fury Single-seat fighter aircraft, powered by a 4,000 lbf (17.8 kN) Allison J35-A-2 turbojet engine, armed with six 0.50 in (12.7 mm) machine guns, 30 built a further 70 were cancelled.

Operators

 United States Navy
 United States Naval Reserves
 United States Marine Corps

Aircraft on display
FJ-1
120349 - Yanks Air Museum in Chino, California.
120351 - National Air and Space Museum in Washington, D.C.

Specifications (FJ-1)

See also

References

Notes

Citations

Bibliography
 Andrade, John M., U.S. Military Aircraft Designations and Serials since 1909. Leicester, England: Midland Counties Publishing, 1979 

 Taylor, John, W.R., ed. Jane's All the World's Aircraft 1965-1966. London: Jane's All the World's Aircraft, 1967. .
 Wagner, Ray. The North American Sabre. London: Macdonald, 1963. No ISBN.
 Winchester, Jim, ed. Military Aircraft of the Cold War (The Aviation Factfile). London: Grange Books plc, 2006. .

External links

F1J-1
Carrier-based aircraft
1940s United States fighter aircraft
Single-engined jet aircraft
Low-wing aircraft
FJ-1
Aircraft first flown in 1946